The Federal Foreign Office, abbreviated AA, is the foreign ministry of the Federal Republic of Germany, a federal agency responsible for both the country's foreign policy and its relationship with the European Union. It is a cabinet-level ministry. Since December 2021, Annalena Baerbock has served as Foreign Minister, succeeding Heiko Maas. The primary seat of the ministry is at the  square in the Mitte district, the historic centre of Berlin.

The term  was the name of the Foreign Office established in 1870 by the North German Confederation, which then became the German Empire's Foreign Office in 1871. It is still the name of the German foreign ministry today. From 1871 to 1919, the Foreign Office was led by a Foreign Secretary, and since 1919, it has been led by the Foreign Minister of Germany.

History

Early years

Foundation

The  was established in 1870 to form the foreign policy of the North German Confederation, and from 1871 of the German Empire. The Foreign Office was originally led by a secretary of state (therefore not called a ministry), while the Chancellor, who usually also held the office of Prussian Minister of Foreign Affairs, remained in charge of foreign affairs.

Bismarck

In the first years of the German nation-state under Otto von Bismarck, the Foreign Office on Wilhelmstrasse No. 76 next to the Reich Chancellery had two departments: one for political affairs and the other for economic, legal and consular matters. After Bismarck's dismissal in 1890, another department for colonial policy was established, spun off as the separate Reichskolonialamt in 1907. Bismarck in order to maintain his control of the  appointed his son Herbert von Bismarck as State Secretary. That Bismarck appointed his son as State Secretary reflected his determination to be his own foreign minister, and his need for an utterly loyal man to run the  when he was not around. Bismarck would not accept opinions contrary to his own, and only those diplomats who were devoted to him rose to high rank. Bismarck greatly valued accurate information, and as such diplomats tended to report what they believed to be the truth back to Berlin.

An exclusive club

To join, one needed a university degree, preferably in jurisprudence and needed to prove that one had a considerable private income. In 1880, a candidate had to prove that he had a private income of at least 6,000 marks/annum in order to join; by 1900, the requirement was 10,000 marks/annum and by 1912, a candidate needed at least 15,000 marks/annum to join.

The income requirement to enter the AA was only dropped in 1918. The most important department by far was the Political Department which between 1871 and 1918 was 61% aristocratic; middle-class men tended to serve in the less important Legal, Trade and Colonial Departments. In the 19th century, it was believed that only aristocrats had the proper social standing and graces to correctly represent the Reich abroad as ambassadors, which explains why no commoner was ever appointed ambassador during the Imperial era.

The  was largely a Protestant institution with Protestant candidates favored over Catholic candidates when it came to recruitment. Even more underrepresented were the Jews. During the Imperial period from 1871 to 1918, the  had only three Jewish members, plus four Jews who had converted to Lutheranism in order to improve their career prospects. If Jews were not formally excluded, Jewish candidates were rarely accepted because of a climate of snobbish anti-Semitism, where Jews were considered to be too pushy, vulgar and lacking in social graces to be diplomats. There were also meritocratic elements within the AA. Besides for the income requirement, to enter the AA during the Imperial period, only candidates with the best grades at university and who knew two foreign languages were considered, and to join one had to pass what was widely considered to be one of the toughest diplomatic entrance exams in the world.

Wilhelm II

The reign of Emperor Wilhelm II was from 1888 to 1918.

The  was split into three factions competing against one another, namely one faction of men loyal to Bismarck, another faction loyal to Friedrich von Holstein, and yet another faction led by Prince Philipp von Eulenburg and Prince Bernhard von Bülow, who would later become chancellor. This constant plotting and scheming between these factions weakened the execution of German foreign policy. As a whole, the Wilhelmstrasse was never entirely in charge of foreign policy in the German Empire, but was instead just one out of several agencies, albeit a very important one that made and executed foreign policy.

In the years 1904–1907, the Reich attempted to form an alliance with the United States on the basis of the supposedly shared fear of the "Yellow Peril" with Wilhelm writing to the American President Theodore Roosevelt a series of letters telling him that Germany and the United States must join forces to stop the "yellow peril", especially Japan from conquering the world. It took the diplomats a long time to tell Wilhelm that Roosevelt was a Japanophile who was not impressed with Wilhelm's call for an alliance based on anti-Asian racism.

Ottomans and the Armenians

In 1915, the German ambassador to the Sublime Porte, Baron Hans von Wangenheim told the American ambassador to the Sublime Porte, Henry Morgenthau Sr.: "I do not blame the Turks for what they are doing to the Armenians... They are entirely justified". On September 28, 1915 Count Johann Heinrich von Bernstorff, the ambassador in Washington, D.C., stated to American journalists that reports of a systematic campaign of extermination against the Armenian minority in the Ottoman empire were all "pure inventions", that these reports were all the work of British propaganda and no such campaign of extermination was taking place. Wangenheim's successor as ambassador to the Sublime Porte, Count Paul Wolff Metternich, was appalled by the Armenian genocide, and, unlike Wangenheim, Metternich was prepared to speak out against the genocide. In August 1916, the triumvirate known as the Three Pashas, which ruled the Ottoman empire, informed the German government that if Count Metternich was not recalled, he would be declared persona non grata. Metternich was promptly recalled from Constantinople rather risk a public relations disaster which potentially could damage German-Ottoman relations in the middle of the war. As the Ottoman empire today would be considered a third world country with almost no modern industry, the Ottoman government was entirely dependent upon weapons from Germany to fight World War I, giving the Reich a powerful form of leverage to apply against the Ottomans on behalf of the Armenians if only the political will in Berlin had been present.

Post-imperial period

It was now under the authority of a foreign minister, though still called Amt for traditional reasons. In 1922, the Foreign Minister Walther Rathenau was assassinated because he was a Jew. The most notable head of the Foreign Office during the Weimar Republic was Gustav Stresemann, foreign minister from 1923 to 1929, who strived for a reconciliation with the French Third Republic, which earned him—together with Aristide Briand—the 1926 Nobel Peace Prize. The replacement of Schubert with Bülow marked the ascendency of the more nationalistic fraction within the  who favored a more confrontational foreign policy with regards to France. In May 1932 Baron Konstantin von Neurath was appointed foreign minister in the "Cabinet of the President's Friends" headed by Franz von Papen. Neurath continued on as Foreign Minister under the governments of General Kurt von Schleicher and Adolf Hitler. During the Nazi period, Neurath found himself exposed to increasing competition from Nazi politicians like Alfred Rosenberg and Joachim von Ribbentrop. In February 1938, Hitler fired Neurath and replaced him with Ribbentrop.

Nazi Germany

In 1933, the vast majority of the diplomats serving in the  came from upper-class families with a disproportionate number coming from the aristocracy. The overrepresentation of aristocrats together with its overwhelming upper-class character gave the  an elitist cachet, and made the  into one of the most prestigious institutions in Germany. There were no female diplomats, and besides for the women employed as secretaries, clerks and cleaners, the  had no female employees. That the men of the  formed an elitist group can be seen that every single diplomat had a university degree (before the 1950s, most Germans did not go to university).

All of the senior diplomats in the 1930s were veterans of the struggle to win Germany "world power status" in the first years of the 20th century. Hitler's goal of making Germany into the world's greatest power was thus a foreign policy goal that the diplomats embraced quite headily. The German historian Eckart Conze stated about the overlap in viewpoints between the diplomats and the Nazis: "...the top diplomats in the Weimar Republic were opposed to a liberal political order and parliamentarianism. And then the Nazis built political and ideological bridges for them. They announced their intention to reverse the Treaty of Versailles and make the German Reich into a world power. The majority of the diplomats were able to sign their names on to such a program." In March 1933, Baron Friedrich Wilhelm von Prittwitz und Gaffron, the Ambassador to the United States, resigned on the grounds that he could not in good conscience serve the Nazi government; he was the only member of the entire  who resigned in protest at the Nazi regime.

For these men, unconditional loyalty to the state was the highest possible value, and though the majority of the diplomats were not ideological National Socialists, they served the Nazi regime loyally until the very end. The dominance of the traditional "insiders" at the  can be seen that every State Secretary during the Nazi era was a professional diplomat. The State Secretaries of Nazi Germany were Prince Bernhard von Bülow (State Secretary 1930–36), Count Hans Georg von Mackensen (State Secretary 1936–1938 and ambassador to Italy 1938–1942), Baron Ernst von Weizsäcker (State Secretary 1938–1943 and ambassador to the Holy See 1943–1945) and Baron Gustav Adolf Steengracht von Moyland (State Secretary 1943–1945). The overlap in goals between the professional diplomats and the Nazis were well illustrated by the memo on what should be the foreign policy of the Hitler government written by Bülow in March 1933 calling for Germany to recover the borders of 1914 and all of the lost colonies, annexation of Austria, and German domination of Eastern Europe.

Aside from Ribbentrop, who served as variously as Commissioner of Disarmament (1934–35), Extraordinary Ambassador-at-Large (1935–36), and Ambassador to Great Britain (1936–1938), the most notable of the "outsiders" were Franz von Papen (Ambassador to Austria 1934–1938 and to Turkey 1939–1944), Hans Luther (Ambassador to the United States 1933–1937), Colonel Hermann Kriebel (Consul in Shanghai 1934–1939), and General Wilhelm Faupel (Ambassador to Spain 1936–37). Most diplomats were not believers in National Socialism, but during Nazi rule, many diplomats such as Neurath himself joined the NSDAP and/or the SS as an opportunistic way of improving their career prospects; such self-interested careerism was rampant amongst the German civil service in the Nazi period. The German historian  wrote that for those diplomats who chose to become involved in Widerstand, given that they were steeped in Prussian traditions where loyalty to the state was the highest virtue, it required "extraordinary strength of character" for them to go against everything that they had been taught to believe in.

Post-WWII

Founding of the Federal Republic
After Germany's defeat in May 1945, the country was occupied and the German state was abolished by the Allies. The country was administered as four zones controlled respectively by the United States, the United Kingdom, France and the Soviet Union. In August 1949, a German government was reestablished in the western zones, the Federal Republic of Germany, which in its first years had very limited powers. In October 1949, the German Democratic Republic was founded in what had been the Soviet zone.

Adenauer
Chancellor Konrad Adenauer took office as the first Foreign Minister in Bonn until he was succeeded by Heinrich von Brentano in 1955. By and large, the men who had served in the new  were the same men who had served in the old . In a Bundestag debate on 23 October 1952, Adenauer admitted that 66% of the diplomats of the  had belonged to the NSDAP, but justified their employment as: "I could not build up a Foreign Office without relying upon such skilled men". Upon Willy Brandt's taking office as Foreign Minister in the Grand coalition under Kurt Georg Kiesinger starting in 1966, the office was usually connected with the position of the Vice-Chancellor. From 1974 until 1992—with a short pause in 1982—Hans-Dietrich Genscher served as Foreign Minister and continued to champion Brandt's Ostpolitik while also playing a crucial role in the preparation of German reunification.

Berlin

In 2000 the Foreign Office returned to Berlin where it took up quarters in the former Reichsbank building, which from 1959 to 1990 had served as the seat of the Central Committee of the Socialist Unity Party of Germany and was enlarged by a newly built annex. The former ministry in Bonn was retained as a secondary seat. The Foreign Office has always stressed its continuity and traditions going back to 1870.

Further historiography and analysis

 2010 report by the historical commission 

A report entitled The Ministry and the Past written by historians and released by the German government in October 2010 shows that wartime-era diplomats played an important role in assisting the Nazis in carrying out the Holocaust, and disproved the claim often made after 1945 that German diplomats were "sand in the machine" who acted to moderate the actions of the Nazi regime. In another interview, Conze stated: "This document makes it clear that all officials in the Foreign Ministry—including low-level office clerks—knew about the mass persecution of Jews and were actively involved in the Holocaust. It was an open secret." In October 1941, when Franz Rademacher visited Belgrade to meet officials of the Government of National Salvation of General Milan Nedić of Serbia, he submitted an expense claim for his trip to his superiors at the  after his return to Berlin; on his expenses claim, Rademacher described the purpose of his trip to Belgrade as the "liquidation of Jews". Later on in 1942, Ambassador Otto Abetz arranged for the deportation of 25,000 French Jews to the death camps in Poland while Ambassador Hanns Ludin arranged for the deportation of 50,000 Slovak Jews to the death camps. In the spring of 1944, Ambassador Edmund Veesenmayer played a key role in having 400,000 Hungarian Jews deported to Auschwitz.

Kolbe

In 2003, the French historian Lucas Delattre published a biography of Fritz Kolbe, a mid-ranking diplomat who become a spy for the American Office of Strategic Services because he believed his country deserved to lose the war on the account of the genocide it was waging against the Jews. Delattre stated that Kolbe really was a case of a diplomat being "sand in the machine" as Kolbe provided intelligence to help his country lose the war, but added sarcastically that if every German civil servant really were "sand in the machine" as almost all of them claimed to be after 1945 that Hitler would never had managed to get anything done. Diplomats like Kolbe were very much the exception, not the rule.

German representation overseas

In addition to the ministry's headquarters in Berlin, Germany has established embassies and consulates around the world.

See also

 Minister for Foreign Affairs (Germany)
 Cabinet of Germany
 Foreign relations of Germany
 List of diplomatic missions of Germany
 Ministry for Foreign Affairs of the German Democratic Republic
 Ambassadors of Nazi Germany

Sources

References

External links
 
  
  

 
Federal government ministries of Germany
Germany
Foreign relations of Germany
Ministries established in 1870